Cara Black and Irina Selyutina defeated Maja Matevžič and Katarina Srebotnik in the final, 3–6, 7–5, 6–3 to win the girls' doubles tennis title at the 1997 Wimbledon Championships.

Seeds

  Cara Black /  Irina Selyutina (champions)
  Andrea Šebová /  Gabriela Voleková (quarterfinals)
  Maja Matevžič /  Katarina Srebotnik (final)
  Marissa Irvin /  Brie Rippner (semifinals)

Draw

Draw

References

External links

Girls' Doubles
Wimbledon Championship by year – Girls' doubles